Yaʿqūb ibn Ṭāriq (died  AD) was an 8th-century Persian astronomer and mathematician who lived in Baghdad.

Works 
Works ascribed to Yaʿqūb ibn Ṭāriq include:
  ("Astronomical tables in the Sindhind resolved for each degree")
  ("Arrangement of the orbs")
  ("Rationales")
  ("Distribution of the kardajas of the sine")
  ("Elevation along the arc of the meridian")

An astrological work called  ("The Chapters") is also ascribed to Yaʿqūb ibn Ṭāriq by an unreliable source.

Yaʿqūb ibn Ṭāriq's , written around 770, was based on a Sanskrit work, thought to be similar to the Brāhmasphuṭasiddhānta. It was brought to the court of al-Mansūr from Sindh, reportedly by a Sindhi astronomer named Kankah.

 dealt with cosmography (the placement and sizes of the heavenly bodies). According to al-Bīrūnī, Yaʿqūb ibn Ṭāriq gave the radius of the Earth as 1,050 , the diameter of the Moon and Mercury as 5,000  (4.8 Earth radii), and the diameter of the other heavenly bodies (Venus, the Sun, Mars, Jupiter, and Saturn) as 20,000  (19.0 Earth radii).

Notes

Further reading 
 
 
 
 
 
  (PDF version)
 Sezgin, Fuat (1978). Geschichte des arabischen Schrifttums. Vol. 6, Astronomie, pp. 124–127. Leiden: E. J. Brill.
 
 

Year of birth missing
796 deaths
8th-century Iranian mathematicians
Astronomers from the Abbasid Caliphate
Astronomers of the medieval Islamic world
People from Baghdad
Medieval Iranian astrologers
8th-century Iranian astronomers
8th-century Arabic writers
8th-century people from the Abbasid Caliphate